Down Liberty Road is a 1956 American short film directed by Harold D. Schuster. The film is also known as Freedom Highway in the United States. It has an early performance by Tommy Kirk.

Plot

Cast
 Morris Ankrum
 Angie Dickinson
 Tommy Kirk
 Tex Ritter
 Marshall Thompson
 Charles Koff
 Clarence Wheeler

References

External links

1956 films
1956 drama films
1956 short films
American drama short films
1950s English-language films
Films directed by Harold D. Schuster
1950s American films